Gravier may refer to:

Surname
Bernard Gravier (1881–1923), French fencer
Charles Gravier, comte de Vergennes (1717–1787), French statesman and diploma
Charles Joseph Gravier (1865–1937), French zoologist
Jacques Gravier (1651–1708), French Jesuit missionary in the New World
Jean-François Gravier, French geographer famous for his 1947 work Paris and the French Desert
Mike Gravier (born 1960), American football coach and former player
Robert Gravier (1905–2005), French politician

Places
Gravier, New Orleans, neighborhood of the city of New Orleans, Louisiana, U.S.A.
Gravier Peaks, prominent, ice-covered peaks, on the west coast of Graham Land, Antarctica

See also
Gravier v City of Liège (1985) Case 293/83, a landmark freedom of movement case in European law
Graver (disambiguation)
Graviera
Gravir
Ravier (disambiguation)

French-language surnames